Captain Thomas Harwood (died 1652) was a Virginia soldier, landowner and politician. He served multiple terms as a burgess in the 1630s and 1640s, and was "one of the chieff of the Mutinous Burgesses" who expelled Governor Sir John Harvey in 1635. He was Speaker of the House of Burgesses 1647–49, and was named to the Council shortly before his death in 1652.

Notes

References

1652 deaths
Speakers of the Virginia House of Burgesses
People from Warwick County, Virginia
Virginia colonial people
English emigrants
Year of birth unknown